Hatsik may refer to:
Hatsik, Armavir, Armenia
Hatsik, Shirak, Armenia